Stig Sæterbakken (4 January 1966 – 24 January 2012) was a Norwegian author. He wrote novels, essays and poems, and worked as a translator.

Life and career
Stig Sæterbakken published his first book at the age of 18, a collection of poems called Floating Umbrellas, while still attending Lillehammer Senior High School. In 1991, Sæterbakken released his first novel, Incubus, followed by The New Testament in 1993. Aestethic Bliss (1994) collected five years of work as an essayist.

Sæterbakken returned to prose in 1997 with the novel Siamese, which marks a significant departure in his style. The following year saw the release of Self-Control. And in 1999, he published Sauermugg. The three books, the S-trilogy—as they are often called—were published in a collected edition in 2000.

In February 2001, Sæterbakken's second collection of essays, The Evil Eye was released. As with Aestethic Bliss this book also represents a summing up and a closing of a new phase in the authorship. In many ways the essays throw light on Sæterbakken's own prose over the last years, the S-trilogy in particular.

Siamese was released in Sweden by Vertigo. Vertigo followed up with a translation of Sauermugg in April 2007. This edition, however, was different from the Norwegian original. It included some of the later published Sauermugg-monologues, together with left overs from the time the book was written, about 50 pages of new material all together. The expanded edition was entitled Sauermugg Redux. Siamese has since been translated into Danish, Czech and English.

Sæterbakken's last novels were The Visit, Invisible Hands, Don't Leave Me and Through the Night. He was awarded the Osloprisen (Oslo Prize) in 2006 for The Visit. Invisible Hands was nominated for both the P2-listener's Novel prize and Youth's Critics' Prize in 2007. The same year he was awarded the Critics Prize and Bokklubbene's Translation Prize for his translation of Nikanor Teratologen's Assisted Living.

Sæterbakken was artistic director of The Norwegian Festival of Literature from 2006 until October 2008, when he resigned owing to the controversy which arose when David Irving was invited to the festival in 2009 (see below).

Sæterbakken's books were released and translated in several countries, among them Russia and US. April 2009 Flamme Forlag released an essay by Sæterbakken, in their series of book-singles, called Yes. No. Yes.

Sæterbakken committed suicide on January 24, 2012, aged 46.

David Irving controversy in 2008
In October 2008 Sæterbakken angrily resigned from his position as content director of the 2009 Norwegian Festival of Literature at Lillehammer. This followed the decision by the board of the festival on October 8/9 to renege on an invitation to controversial author and Holocaust denier David Irving to speak at the festival. Sæterbakken was the initiator of the invitation. A media storm had erupted in Norway over Irving's appearance and several high-profile writers had denounced the initiative and called for a boycott of the festival. Even Norway's free speech organization Fritt Ord had requested that its logo be removed from the festival. Sæterbakken characterized his colleagues as "damned cowards" arguing that they were walking in lockstep.

Bibliography

Books translated to English
"Siamese"(originally published in Norwegian in 1997)issued by Dalkey Archive Press (Champaign, Illinois, USA), January 2010.  Translated by Stokes Schwartz.
"Self-Control" issued by Dalkey Archive Press (Champaign, Illinois, US), November 2012.  Translated by Sean Kinsella 
 "Through the Night" issued by Dalkey Archive Press (Champaign, Illinois, US), June 2013. Translated by Sean Kinsella. Long-listed for Best Translated Book Award 2014.

References

1966 births
2012 suicides
Suicides in Norway
Norwegian essayists
20th-century Norwegian novelists
21st-century Norwegian novelists
20th-century essayists
21st-century essayists